Sir John Macdonell  (1 August 1846 – 17 March 1921) was a British jurist. He was King's Remembrancer (1912–1920) and invested as a Knight Commander of the Order of the Bath. Shaw of Dunfermline gives a prefatory biography in Historical Trials.

John Macdonnell married writer and journalist Agnes Harrison in 1873.

Selected publications
 
 
 The Law of Master and Servant, 1883
 ; 1914 edition, Boston: Little, Brown & Co.
 Law and Eugenics, 1916
 Historical Trials OUP, 1927; republished in 1931, 1933, 1936 as #23 in Thinker's Library

References

External links

Sir John Macdonell, National Portrait Gallery, London
 

1846 births
1921 deaths
Alumni of the University of Aberdeen
Members of the Middle Temple
Philosophers of law
English legal writers
English legal professionals
British legal scholars
Knights Commander of the Order of the Bath
English male non-fiction writers
Fellows of the British Academy
Knights Bachelor
Masters of the High Court (England and Wales)